Edifier, officially Beijing Edifier Technology Company, Ltd., is a Chinese audio equipment manufacturer that primarily produces speakers, music systems, and headphones for personal and home entertainment.

Background
Established in May 1996 in Beijing, China.

There are 3,000 employees worldwide.
 
In December 2011, Edifier announced the acquisition of 100% equity in the Japanese high-end-audio equipment maker STAX.

Milestones 
 August 1996 - Established first North American office in Canada.
 April 1998 - Established second production center in Beijing, China
 1999 - Became the first to manufacture 2.1 and 4.1 speakers with wooden enclosures in China. The satellite + subwoofer design made Edifier a household brand across Mainland China for their computer speakers.
 2007 - Headquarters relocates to Shenzhen with continued operations in Beijing
 February 5, 2010 - Edifier launched its initial public offering, becoming the first public listed audio speaker company in China
 March, 2011 - 100% acquisition of STAX, a Japanese electrostatic earspeaker company
January 2020 - Launched gaming headphones brand at CES 2020.

Brand 

 Edifier
 STAX - Japanese high-end electrostatic earspeaker
 Airpulse - High-end hi-fi speaker brand
 HECATE - Gaming headphone brand
 Huazai(花再) - Brand for young consumer
 Xemal - Low-end wireless earbuds brand
 Volona - Wireless earbuds brand for female consumer

See also 
 List of studio monitor manufacturers

References

Audio equipment manufacturers of China
Manufacturing companies based in Beijing
Loudspeaker manufacturers
Headphones manufacturers
Chinese brands
Manufacturing companies established in 1996